Thomas Matthew Nowatzke (born September 30, 1942) is a former National Football League running back of Polish descent from 1965 through 1972. He scored a touchdown for the Baltimore Colts in Super Bowl V. He was inducted into the National Polish-American Sports Hall of Fame in 2008. He now runs a truck and trailer repair shop in Whitmore Lake, Michigan.

References

Living people
1942 births
American people of Polish descent
American football running backs
Baltimore Colts players
Detroit Lions players
Indiana Hoosiers football players
People from La Porte, Indiana
Players of American football from Indiana